Rishyasringar is a 1941 Tamil-language film directed by S. Soundararajan. It stars Vasundhara Devi, Ranjan and S. Balachander. The music score was provided by the Sarma Brothers and V. Nagayya. Lyrics were penned by Papanasam Rajagopala Iyer.

Cast 
Cast according to the songbook:

Male Cast
 Balachandran as Young Rishya Sringan
 R. Ranjan B. A. as Rishya Singar
 G. Pattu Iyer as Vibandakar
 T. E. Krishnamachariar as Romapada Rajan
 K. N. Ramamurthi Iyer as Gauthamar
 R. K. Ramasami as Sudevar 
 R. B. Yagneshwara Iyer as Pauthayanar
 M. S. Murugesam as Marichan
 T. V. Sethuraman as Subhagu

Female Cast
 Vasundhara as Maya
 Kumari Murali as Shantha
 Kumari Rukmani as Padmini
 V. M. Pankajam as Urvasi
 K. N. Kamalam as Sudevi

References

External links
 

1941 films
1940s Tamil-language films
Indian black-and-white films